Daebawisan (대바위산, 大바위山) is a mountain of South Korea. It has an altitude of 1091 metres

See also
List of mountains of Korea

References

Mountains of Gangwon Province, South Korea
Inje County
Mountains of South Korea